Sangokushi Battlefield (三國志 Battlefield) is Koei's real time strategy game for Windows 98, and the 2nd online Romance of the Three Kingdoms game for the PC platform. The game was simultaneously released in Japan, Taiwan, and Korea.

Japanese server began operation on August 30, 2002.

Taiwan server began operation in July 2002, and was terminated November 15, 2006.

References

2002 video games
Romance of the Three Kingdoms (video game series)
Real-time strategy video games
Video games developed in Japan
Windows games
Windows-only games